The 1916 Colorado gubernatorial election was held on November 7, 1916. Democratic nominee Julius Caldeen Gunter defeated incumbent Republican George Alfred Carlson with 53.27% of the vote.

Primary elections
Primary elections were held on September 12, 1916.

Democratic primary

Candidates
Julius Caldeen Gunter, former Associate Justice of the Colorado Supreme Court

Results

Republican primary

Candidates
George Alfred Carlson, incumbent Governor
Samuel D. Nicholson, former Mayor of Leadville

Results

General election

Candidates
Major party candidates
Julius Caldeen Gunter, Democratic
George Alfred Carlson, Republican

Other candidates
C. Goddard, Socialist
Louis E. Leeder, Independent

Results

References

1916
Colorado
Gubernatorial